Bournville is a brand of dark chocolate produced by Cadbury. It is named after the model village of the same name in Birmingham, England and was first sold in 1908.

The brand is widely available throughout the United Kingdom and India and has a minimum 36% cocoa content there. In 2014, Cadbury redesigned it as a "premium" brand in India, increasing the cocoa content from 44% to 50% and giving it new, black packaging.

References

British confectionery
Chocolate bars
Cadbury brands
Mondelez International brands